This is a list of World Heritage Sites in Uzbekistan with properties of cultural and natural heritage in Uzbekistan as inscribed in UNESCO's World Heritage List or as on the country's tentative list. As of 2016, five sites in Uzbekistan are included. In addition to its inscribed sites, Uzbekistan also lists thirty  properties on its tentative list.

World Heritage Sites 
Site; named after the World Heritage Committee's official designation
Location; at city, regional, or provincial level and geocoordinates
Criteria; as defined by the World Heritage Committee
Area; in hectares and acres. If available, the size of the buffer zone has been noted as well. A value of zero implies that no data has been published by UNESCO
Year; during which the site was inscribed to the World Heritage List
Description; brief information about the site, including reasons for qualifying as an endangered site, if applicable

List of properties in the tentative list
In addition to sites inscribed on the World Heritage List, member states can maintain a list of tentative sites that they may consider for nomination. Nominations for the World Heritage List are only accepted if the site was previously listed on the tentative list. The sites, along with the year they were included on the tentative list are:

References 

Uzbekistan
Uzbekistan geography-related lists
 List
World Heritage Sites